Golabar Rural District is in the Central District of Ijrud County, Zanjan province, Iran. At the National Census of 2006, its population was 13,644 in 3,433 households. There were 14,921 inhabitants in 4,111 households at the following census of 2011. At the most recent census of 2016, the population of the rural district was 14,321 in 4,373 households. The largest of its 27 villages was Juqin, with 3,129 people.

References 

Ijrud County

Rural Districts of Zanjan Province

Populated places in Zanjan Province

Populated places in Ijrud County